Marcel Wade (born August 26, 1975), better known by his stage name Cellski, and also Young Cellski, 2Took, Break-a-B***h, Big Mafi,  Coach Cellichick and Mr. Predictor is an American rapper/records producer from San Francisco. He is also the CEO of his label, Inner City2K Records.

Early life
Cellski grew up on Randolph St. in the Oceanview, locally known as "Lakeview", neighborhood of San Francisco. He cited Too Short as his main influence. When he was 13, the future rapper was taken to Al Eaton's studio where Short was recording his debut best-selling album Life Is...Too Short. Wade first began his career selling tapes from the trunk of his car in 1992.

Business ventures
In 2012, Cellski started a streetwear clothing line called Chemical Baby; the name was inspired by the toxic dirt and water found in his community. In October 2022, inspired by his mother and grandmother's cooking, Cellski started a culinary popup called Big Mafi Burger. He also has an equity cannabis license with 2Took Farms, distributing Cookies, Berner's product.

Discography

Studio albums
 Mr. Predicter (1995)
 Canadian Bacon and Hash Browns (1999)
 Mafia Moves (2001)
 Mr. Predicter Chapter 2 (2006)
 Chef Boy Cellski's Culinary Arts Institution (2009)
 Big Mafi The Don (2011)
 Chemical Baby (2015)
 Legendary (2018)

Collaboration albums
 Little Big & Big Mafi with Killa Keise (2003)

Compilation albums
 The Collection (2000)
 The Collection Part 2 (2003)

Mixtapes
 Freestyle Mixtape Vol. 1: Me & My Niggs (2001)
 Freestyle Mixtape Vol. 2: Outta Da Dome (2002)
 Freestyle Mixtape Vol. 3: Its Not a Game with Killa Keise (2003)
 Freestyle Mixtape Vol. 5: What Is It, Mayne?! with Killa Keise (2003)
 Freestyle Mixtape Vol. 6: Stunna-Vision (2004)
 Freestyle Mixtape Vol. 7: Coach Cellichick (2009)

Extended plays
 Inner City Life - The Lost EP (1992)
 Living In the Bay (1992)

Guest appearances

References

Rappers from San Francisco
American hip hop record producers
American chief executives
Businesspeople from San Francisco
1974 births
Living people
Gangsta rappers
21st-century American rappers
Record producers from California